Commondale is a village and civil parish in the Scarborough 
district of North Yorkshire, England that lies within the North York Moors National Park.

The village is served by Commondale railway station. It has a small pub called The Cleveland Inn.

According to the 2011 UK census, Commondale parish had a population of 129, the same as in the 2001 UK census.

The village's name was also historically recorded as Colmandale or Colemandale.

Commondale is also the home of the Cleveland County Scouts campsite known as Raven Gill Campsite. This is used by Scouts and other youth groups from all around the world. This provides a good trade for the village pub and also promotes good farming practice in the area.

References

External links

Villages in North Yorkshire
Civil parishes in North Yorkshire
Valleys of the North York Moors